Paul Ehmann (born 15 February 1993) is a German footballer who is currently a free agent after having last played for UC Santa Barbara Gauchos.

Early career in Germany 
After playing for numerous youth teams in Germany, it was announced on 3 April 2012 that Ehmann was to transfer to Borussia Dortmund II under former American international David Wagner.  He made his first appearance for the club on 28 July 2012 against Arminia Bielefeld as a 90th-minute substitute.

UC Santa Barbara 
It was announced on 1 March 2013 that Ehmann would be enrolling at the University of California, Santa Barbara to play for Tim Vom Steeg on the UC Santa Barbara Gauchos men's soccer team.

After playing two seasons with the Gauchos, it was announced Ehmann had left the team on 6 October 2014 due to family reasons.  He appeared in 29 games total and recorded 1 assist.

References

External links 
 
 UC Santa Barbara player profile

1993 births
Living people
German footballers
Borussia Dortmund II players
3. Liga players
UC Santa Barbara Gauchos men's soccer players
Association football midfielders
Sportspeople from Ludwigshafen
Footballers from Rhineland-Palatinate
VfR Frankenthal players